Dantzler is a surname. Notable people with the surname include:

Cameron Dantzler (born 1998), American football player
Connor Dantzler (born 1994), American athlete
Rick Dantzler (born 1956), American lawyer and politician
T. C. Dantzler (born 1970), American Greco-Roman wrestler
Tom Dantzler (born 1941), American politician
Woodrow Dantzler (born 1979), American football player